The 2017 Northern European Gymnastics Championships was an artistic gymnastics competition held in the town of Tórshavn, the capital of the Faroe Islands. The event was held between 21 and 22 October.

Medalists

References

Northern European Gymnastics Championships
2017 in gymnastics